is a conflicts of laws case, important for UK company law and English tort law, concerning the claim of a worker in Namibia attempting to sue an employer headquartered in the United Kingdom for breach of the duty of care to ensure proper health and safety in the workplace.

Facts
Mr Connelly mined uranium in Namibia for RTZ’s wholly owned subsidiary, Rossing Uranium Ltd. He developed cancer, squamous-cell carcinoma of the larynx, from uranium ore dust and sued RTZ, alleging that it played a role in setting its subsidiary’s health and safety procedures, and therefore owed him a duty of care. RTZ argued Mr Connelly should sue the subsidiary only and was limited to an action in Namibia. This case was determined in the House of Lords in favour of Mr Connelly.

Following his win in the House of Lords, Mr Connelly pursued RTZ in the English High Court. This time, RTZ contended that it owed no duty of care at all, and in addition the action was time barred under the Limitation Act 1980 sections 11 and 14. Also, it was Namibian law that applied under the Foreign Limitation Periods Act 1984, s 1.

Judgment

House of Lords
House of Lords found the matter could not be heard in Namibia, given the complexity and cost of the case, so London was the appropriate forum.

Lord Hoffmann dissented. ‘If the presence of the defendants, as parent company and local subsidiary of a multinational, can enable them to be sued here, any multinational with its parent company in England will be liable to be sued here in respect of its activities anywhere in the world.

High Court
Wright J dismissed the striking out application, but allowed the limitation point. It was arguable that RTZ had a duty of care, but Mr Connelly could have brought the case in 1989 and chose not to. Therefore, Mr Connelly's claim failed because he had not brought the action within the statutory time limits.

See also

Conflicts of laws

Notes

References

United Kingdom company case law
English tort case law
House of Lords cases
1997 in case law
1997 in British law